John Dearth (16 October 1920 – 17 March 1984) was a British actor, known for playing countless roles in nearly 30 episodes of ITV series The Adventures of Robin Hood.

He is also remembered for playing two villains in science fiction series Doctor Who: firstly voicing the maniacal supercomputer BOSS in Season 10 finale The Green Death and then portraying the greedy Lupton in the following season finale Planet of the Spiders.

Other television appearances include Dixon of Dock Green, The Adventures of William Tell, The Four Just Men, Emergency Ward 10, No Hiding Place, The Avengers (Propellant 23), The Saint, Z-Cars, Theatre 625, Softly, Softly, The Wednesday Play, Justice, Thirty-Minute Theatre, Play of the Month, Angels, Treasure Island, Play for Today and Kessler. Dearth was also a member of the BBC Radio Repertory Company during the 1960s.

Theatre 
Initially, Dearth began his acting career in theatre. After a working trip to America in 1951 appearing in Caesar and Cleopatra/Antony and Cleopatra on Broadway, he returned to England the following year and performed at the Connaught Theatre in Worthing. He made his debut as a mythical god in Isle of Umbrellas as well as playing Iago in Othello. He left to join The Old Vic theatre company, playing Guildenstern in Hamlet at the Edinburgh Festival, as well as being an understudy to Richard Burton in the title role. More performances followed at the Old Vic with Burton (where Dearth became friends with the Welshman).

Personal life 
In 1959, Dearth lost a part in the film A Touch of Larceny, fired by the producer, Ivan Foxwell, who felt he bore too much of a resemblance to leading man James Mason. According to Barry Letts on the Planet of the Spiders DVD commentary, this experience embittered Dearth for the rest of his life. Personal problems meant he found work difficult to come by later in life. The actor was known to be a heavy drinker which may have resulted in his untimely death. Letts described Dearth as "a lovely man, but ruined by drink."

Dearth's daughter was the actress Lynn Dearth (1946–1994).

Filmography
 The Flying Scot a.k.a. The Mailbag Robbery (1957) - Father
 Dangerous Exile (1957) - Simon the Jailer (uncredited)
 Breakout (1959) - Lt. Robson
 Look Back in Anger (1959) - Pet Stall Man
 The Wreck of the Mary Deare (1959) - Reporter (uncredited)
 The Young Jacobites (1960) - Sergeant
 Dead Lucky (1960) - Torrance
 Circle of Deception (1960) - Captain Ormrod
 The Shadow of the Cat - Constable Hamer (uncredited)
 The Day the Earth Caught Fire (1961) - Dick (uncredited)
 Three Spare Wives (1962) - News Editor
 The Road to Hong Kong (1962) - Leader's Man (uncredited)
 Strongroom (1962) - Police Sergeant Hopkins
 The Runaway (1964) - Sgt. Hardwick

References

External links
 
 John Dearth at Theatricalia
 

1920 births
1984 deaths
English male television actors
20th-century British male actors
Alcohol-related deaths in England